The 1981 New York Yankees season was the franchise's 79th season. Games were suspended for 50 days due to the 1981 Major League Baseball strike, causing a split season. The Yankees competed as members of the American League East, finishing first in the first half of the season, and tying for fifth in the second half of the season; overall, they won 59 games while losing 48. The team advanced to the postseason due to their first-half first-place finish, where they defeated the Milwaukee Brewers in the American League Division Series and the Oakland Athletics in the American League Championship Series, capturing the Yankees' only pennant of the 1980s. The Yankees then lost the World Series in six games to the Los Angeles Dodgers. The Yankees played their home games at Yankee Stadium and were managed by Gene Michael until September 5, and by Bob Lemon thereafter.

Offseason 
 November 18, 1980: Brad Gulden was traded by the New York Yankees with $150,000 to the Seattle Mariners for a player to be named later and Larry Milbourne. The Seattle Mariners sent back Brad Gulden (May 18, 1981) to the New York Yankees to complete the trade. In effect, Brad Gulden was traded for himself.
 December 8, 1980: Brian Doyle was drafted from the Yankees by the Oakland Athletics in the 1980 rule 5 draft.
 December 15, 1980: Dave Winfield was signed as a free agent with the New York Yankees.
 February 16, 1981: Rafael Santana was traded by the Yankees to the St. Louis Cardinals for a player to be named later. The Cardinals completed the deal by sending George Frazier to the Yankees on June 7.
 March 31, 1981: Chris Welsh, Ruppert Jones, Joe Lefebvre, and Tim Lollar were traded by the Yankees to the San Diego Padres for Jerry Mumphrey and John Pacella.

Regular season 
The team finished in first place in the American League East for the first half of the season with a 34-22 record, but finished fifth in the second half with a 25-26 record, for an overall record of 59-48. The season was suspended for 50 days due to the infamous 1981 players strike and the league chose as its playoff teams, the division winners from the first and second halves of the season, respectively.

Notable transactions 
 April 6, 1981: Johnny Oates was signed as a free agent by the Yankees.
 May 20, 1981: Jim Spencer and Tom Underwood were traded by the Yankees to the Oakland Athletics for Dave Revering, Mike Patterson, and Chuck Dougherty (minors).
 June 12, 1981: Doug Bird, a player to be named later, and $400,000 were traded by the Yankees to the Chicago Cubs for Rick Reuschel. The Yankees completed the deal by sending Mike Griffin to the Cubs on August 5.
 August 19, 1981: Pat Tabler was traded by the Yankees to the Chicago Cubs for players to be named later. The Cubs completed the deal by sending Bill Caudill to the Yankees on April 1, 1982, and Jay Howell to the Yankees on August 2.

Draft picks 
June 8, 1981: 1981 Major League Baseball Draft
John Elway was drafted by the Yankees in the 2nd round.
Phil Lombardi was drafted by the Yankees in the 3rd round.
Eric Plunk was drafted by the Yankees in the 4th round. Player signed June 15, 1981.
Fred McGriff was drafted by the Yankees in the 9th round. McGriff signed on June 11, 1981.

Season standings

Record vs. opponents

Roster

Game log

Regular season

First half

|-

|-

|-

|- style="text-align:center;"
| Legend:       = Win       = Loss       = PostponementBold = Yankees team member

Second half

|- style="background:#bbcaff;"
| – || August 9 || ||colspan=10 |1981 Major League Baseball All-Star Game at Cleveland Stadium in Cleveland
|-

|-

|-

|- style="text-align:center;"
| Legend:       = Win       = Loss       = PostponementBold = Yankees team member

Postseason Game log

|-

|-

|-

|- style="text-align:center;"
| Legend:       = Win       = Loss       = PostponementBold = Yankees team member

Player stats

Batting

Starters by position 
Note: Pos = Position; G = Games played; AB = At bats; H = Hits; Avg. = Batting average; HR = Home runs; RBI = Runs batted in

Other batters 
Note: G = Games played; AB = At bats; H = Hits; Avg. = Batting average; HR = Home runs; RBI = Runs batted in

Pitching

Starting pitchers 
Note: G = Games pitched; IP = Innings pitched; W = Wins; L = Losses; ERA = Earned run average; SO = Strikeouts

Other pitchers 
Note: G = Games pitched; IP = Innings pitched; W = Wins; L = Losses; ERA = Earned run average; SO = Strikeouts

Relief pitchers 
Note: G = Games pitched; W = Wins; L = Losses; SV = Saves; ERA = Earned run average; SO = Strikeouts

Postseason

ALDS 

New York wins series, 3-2.

ALCS 

New York Yankees win the Series over the Oakland Athletics, 3-0

World Series

Awards and honors 
 Tommy John, Lou Gehrig Memorial Award
 Dave Righetti was honored as the AL Rookie of the Year.
 Graig Nettles, Most Valuable Player in the AL Championship Series.

All-Star Game
 Willie Randolph
 Bucky Dent
 Reggie Jackson
 Dave Winfield
 Ron Davis
 Rich Gossage

Farm system

Notes

References 
1981 New York Yankees at Baseball Reference
1981 World Series
1981 New York Yankees team page at www.baseball-almanac.com

New York Yankees seasons
New York Yankees
New York Yankees
1980s in the Bronx
American League East champion seasons
American League champion seasons